The women's 50 metres hurdles event at the 1969 European Indoor Games was held on 8 March in Belgrade.

Medalists

Results

Heats
First 2 from each heat (Q) and the next 1 fastest (q) qualified for the final.

Final

References

60 metres hurdles at the European Athletics Indoor Championships
50